The Fascio Rivoluzionario d'Azione Internazionalista was a political programmatic manifesto that advocated Italy's participation in World War I on the side of the Triple Entente against the Central Powers. It was drawn up on 5 October 1914 by revolutionary syndicalists and interventionists members of the Unione Sindacale Italiana. The usefulness of the First World War was asserted as an historical moment indispensable for the development of more advanced societies in a political-social sense. The manifesto inspired the formation of the Fasci d'Azione Rivoluzionaria.

The promoting committee was made up of: Decio Bacchi, Michele Bianchi, Ugo Clerici, Filippo Corridoni, Amilcare De Ambris, Attilio Deffenu, Aurelio Galassi, Angelo Oliviero Olivetti, Decio Papa, Cesare Rossi, Silvio Rossi, Sincere Rugarli and Libero Tancredi.

References 

Italian Fascism
Syndicalism
Revolutionary Syndicalism